Alexios Halebian (born 8 June 1994) is an American tennis player.

Halebian has a career high ATP singles ranking of 537 achieved on 6 June 2016. He also has a career high ATP doubles ranking of 515 achieved on 6 February 2017.

Halebian made his ATP main draw debut at the 2017 Citi Open after defeating Wil Spencer and Marc Polmans in qualifying. He was defeated by Lukáš Lacko in the first round.

External links
 
 
 

1994 births
Living people
American male tennis players
People from Hollywood, Los Angeles
American people of Armenian descent
Tennis people from California